Poecilocampa populi, the December moth, is a moth of the family Lasiocampidae.

Description
The moth flies from October to December depending on the location.

The larvae feed on various deciduous trees, such as oak, poplar and lime (Tilia).

Distribution
It is found in Europe, Northern Asia and Japan.

Gallery

External links

December moth at UKmoths
Fauna Europaea
Lepidoptera of Belgium
Vlindernet.nl 

Lasiocampidae
Moths described in 1758
Moths of Europe
Taxa named by Carl Linnaeus